Klement Schuh (13 June 1916 – August 1995) was an Austrian weightlifter. He competed in the men's middleweight event at the 1948 Summer Olympics.

References

1916 births
1995 deaths
Austrian male weightlifters
Olympic weightlifters of Austria
Weightlifters at the 1948 Summer Olympics
Place of birth missing
20th-century Austrian people